An anthology is a collection of literary works.

Anthology or anthologies may also refer to:

 Anthology film, consisting of several short films
 Anthology series, a radio or television program with a changing cast or format

Music albums
The term anthology is often used for a one-artist compilation album of musical works.

 Anthology (Alien Ant Farm album)
 Anthology (Anti-Nowhere League album)
 Anthology (Anvil album)
 Anthology (Asia album)
 Anthology (Bad Manners album), 2001
 Anthology (Belinda Carlisle album), 2014
 Anthology (Ben E. King album), 1993
 Anthology (Bic Runga album)
 Anthology (Bruce Dickinson video), 2006
 Anthology (Bryan Adams album), 2005
 Anthology (Cameo album), 2002
 Anthology (Can album), 1994
 Anthology (Carly Simon album), 2002
 Anthology (Chilliwack album)
 Anthology (Christie Front Drive album)
 Anthology (Chuck Berry album), 2000
 Anthology (Colosseum album), 2000
 , a 2014 Dan Reed Network album
 Anthology (Ensemble Renaissance album), 1997
 Anthology (Generation X compilation)
 Anthology (House of Lords album), 2008
 The Anthology (James Reyne album), 2014
 Anthology (Jasper Wrath album)
 Anthology (Juice Newton album)
 Anthology (Kate Ceberano album), 2016
 Anthology (Manowar album)
 Anthology (Michael Jackson album), 1986
 Anthology (New Grass Revival album), 1990
 Anthology (Obituary album), 2001
 Anthology (Oingo Boingo album)
 Anthology (Patrice Rushen album)
 Anthology (Quarashi album)
 Ray Charles Anthology
 Anthology, a 1998 Roger Daltrey album
 Anthology (Rough Cutt album), 2008
 Anthology (Sammy Hagar album)
 Anthology (Saxon album), 1988
 Anthology (Selena album)
 Anthology (Stella Parton album)
 Anthology (Steve Alaimo album)
 Anthology (Steve Miller Band album)
 Anthology (The Temptations album)
 Anthology (The Babys album)
 Anthology (The Band album), 1978
 Anthology (The Clean album), 2002
 Anthology (The Jackson 5 album), 1976
 Anthology (The Miracles album), 1974
 Anthology (The Moody Blues album), 1998
 Anthology (The Supremes album), 1974
 Anthology (Thrice album)
 Anthology (UFO album), 1986
 Anthology (Grover Washington Jr. album), 1981
 Anthology (Pete Townshend album), 2005
 Anthology (B-Sides & Unreleased), a 2008 album by rapper AZ
 Anthology of Bread (aka The Sound of Bread)
 Anthology: 1999–2013, an album by Underoath
 Anthology: A Decade of Hits 1988–1998, an album by Dream Warriors
 Anthology: Down in Birdland, an album by The Manhattan Transfer
 Anthology: Marvin Gaye
 Hey! Ho! Let's Go: The Anthology, an album by the Ramones
 The Anthology (1947–1972), an album by Muddy Waters
 The Anthology (1968–1992), an album by Richard Pryor
 The Anthology (A Tribe Called Quest album), 1999
 The Anthology (Bachman–Turner Overdrive album)
 The Anthology (Deep Purple album)
 The Anthology (Joe Cocker album), 1999
 The Anthology 1961–1977, an album by The Impressions and Curtis Mayfield
 The Anthology... So Far, a 2001 album by Ringo Starr
 The Beatles Anthology
 John Lennon Anthology

Other uses
 Anthologies (Magic: The Gathering), a card game compilation set
 Anthology (band), a metal band from Slovakia
 Anthology (music venue), a music venue and restaurant in San Diego, California
 Anthology Film Archives, a New York City film archive and theater specializing in avant-garde, experimental, and independent cinema